Loddiswell railway station is a William Clarke-designed station on the Kingsbridge branch of the GWR.

History
The stone built station opened on the 19 December 1893 when the Great Western Railway(GWR) opened the Kingsbridge branch line. The line had been planned, and authorised in 1882, by the Kingsbridge and Salcombe Railway which was subsequently acquired by the GWR in 1888.

The station was host to a GWR camp coach from 1934 to 1939. A camping coach was also positioned here by the Western Region from 1952 to 1957 then two coaches from 1958 to 1961.

The  station was downgraded to an unstaffed halt when it closed to freight on 6 February 1961. Despite local opposition it was closed on 16 September 1963 and is now a private dwelling. 'The Signal Box' annex was redeveloped as holiday accommodation and opened in 2015. Tours of the station grounds and old platform are provided by the owners by arrangement.

References

Bibliography

External links
 
 
 

Former Great Western Railway stations
Disused railway stations in Devon
Railway stations in Great Britain opened in 1893
Railway stations in Great Britain closed in 1963